The Taipei Xia-Hai City God Temple is a temple dedicated to the City God or Cheng Huang Ye (城隍爺) in Taipei, Taiwan.

History
The Xia-Hai City God Temple was built in 1859, and maintained by a single family to the present day. The Ministry of the Interior designated the site an historical monument in 1985. It is located on Dihua Street in Dadaocheng, which is today part of Datong District in Taipei. The temple houses over six hundred deities in its 152 square meters of area, resulting in the highest statue density in Taiwan.

References

1859 establishments in Taiwan
Religious buildings and structures completed in 1859
Taoist temples in Taipei